Mark Richard Hunt (born 23 March 1974) is a New Zealand former mixed martial artist and kickboxer of Samoan descent, currently living in Sydney, Australia. Hunt competed in the Ultimate Fighting Championship (UFC) until 2018 and was the winner of the 2001 K-1 World Grand Prix.  He is known as "King of Walk-Offs" due to his popularization of walking away and stopping attacks before the referee officially ends the match.

Background
Hunt was born in South Auckland, into a large Samoan family, and was a troubled child eventually leading to two jail terms for violent offending. He had no intention to be a professional fighter until a late night altercation outside a nightclub just after getting out of jail for the second time in Auckland changed the course of his life. The brawl did not last long, and Hunt knocked out multiple people. Sam Marsters, one of the bouncers at the door was impressed by the young man's knockout power and invited him to his gym to take up formal training, and a week later, Hunt won a Muay Thai kickboxing match via knockout. Hunt received a six-pack of beer as a reward for the fight. Later that year Hunt moved to Sydney, Australia (residing in Campbelltown), to train with Alex Tui, and few years later he settled in Liverpool Kickboxing Gym under Maori instructor Hape Ngaranoa.

Kickboxing career

K-1
In the beginning of his career, Hunt was used by the promoters as a stepping stone for their up-and-coming fighters, taking up fights at short notice, until Tarik Solak promoted K-1 Oceania tournament in February 2000. With a record of (15–4, 3 KO's) Hunt entered his first K-1 tournament as a heavy underdog.

He won the K-1 Oceania title by knocking out "The Coconut Crusher" Aumitagi in quarter finals, Rony Sefo in semis and Phil Fagan in the finals. After this he was invited to Japan for K-1 qualifications. He lost his first international fight by unanimous decision against Jérôme Le Banner.

In 2001, Hunt returned to K-1 by winning the K-1 Oceania tournament for the second consecutive year. After that he took part of K-1 World GP 2001 in Melbourne, where he beat Japanese boxer Hiromi Amada, before suffering a close unanimous decision loss to reigning champion Ernesto Hoost. However, because of his exciting fighting style Hunt was granted a wildcard spot in the repercharge tournament for the K-1 World GP 2001 Finals, when Mirko Cro Cop had to pull out due to injury. He was drawn against Ray Sefo, who won the bout by outpointing Hunt. After the fight however, Sefo suffered an eye injury and was not able to continue, allowing Hunt to proceed in his place. Hunt then TKO'd Adam Watt to earn his place in the K-1 World Grand Prix Finals at the Tokyo Dome.

During the matchmaking for the K-1 Finals, Hunt surprised the crowd by choosing Jérôme Le Banner, whom he had just lost in the previous year, as his quarterfinal opponent. Hunt won the rematch by knocking out Le Banner in the second round and advanced himself onto the semi-finals facing Stefan Leko. Hunt knocked down Leko two times in the first round and went on to win the fight by unanimous decision. The stage was set for the final battle against Brazilian Kyokushin karate champion Francisco Filho. In the final Hunt defeated Filho by unanimous decision to become the K-1 World Grand Prix 2001 champion.

In 2002, Hunt went to Paris to fight Le Banner again for the third time what turned out to be one of the biggest battles in K-1 history. Le Banner, fighting in front of his hometown audience, knocked down Hunt in the second round but was in turn knocked down himself a few seconds later. In the final moments of the round, Hunt was knocked down for the second time again by the powerful Frenchman. In between rounds the towel was thrown in as Hunt could not continue.

On 17 December 2002, Mark Hunt returned to defend his K-1 World Grand Prix Championship. In quarter finals, entering the third round and behind on all scorecards, Mark was able to connect with a right cross that knocked out Stefan Leko and advanced him to the semi-finals against his career long nemesis Jerome Le Banner. Despite knocking down the Frenchman at the end of the third round, Hunt lost the fight by decision. It would to be his last K-1 World Grand Prix appearance.

In April 2008, FEG announced Hunt's return to K-1 and nominated him as the challenger of K-1 Super Heavyweight Championship held by Semmy Schilt. The match was held on 13 April 2008, in Yokohama, Japan at the K-1 World GP 2008 in Yokohama. Hunt lost the fight at the end of the first round by spinning back kick to the body.

Mixed martial arts career

PRIDE Fighting Championship
Hunt's mixed martial arts career saw him fight in events in Japan's PRIDE Fighting Championships. His first MMA fight was a submission loss to Hidehiko Yoshida, an Olympic gold medalist in judo. In his second fight, he defeated American wrestler Dan Bobish by TKO. Hunt stepped in as a late replacement for Sakuraba, and won a split decision against an outweighed PRIDE middleweight (205 lb) champion Wanderlei Silva. Silva, renowned for his brutal punching and Muay Thai clinch game, was neutralized by the hard-hitting Samoan and knocked down several times in the fight. At the PRIDE Shockwave 2005 event, Hunt surprisingly defeated Mirko Cro Cop via a split decision, after his earlier loss to him in K-1. At PRIDE 31: Unbreakable, Hunt defeated Japanese boxer Yosuke Nishijima in the third round with a powerful one-two punch.

Hunt's next fight was in the opening round of PRIDE's 2006 Open-Weight Grand Prix (PRIDE Total Elimination Absolute) on 5 May 2006. His opponent was Japan's Tsuyoshi Kohsaka, who he defeated by TKO in the second round. He then faced American catch-wrestler Josh Barnett at PRIDE Critical Countdown Absolute in the second round of the tournament. Hunt was immediately taken down by Barnett and ultimately lost to a kimura submission roughly two and a half minutes into the first round.

Following that fight, Hunt next lost to PRIDE Heavyweight Champion Fedor Emelianenko at PRIDE Shockwave 2006. Hunt controlled Emelianenko most of the fight and even effectively countered an armbar early in the bout. Hunt's greatest chance of winning came when he was able to put Emelianenko in an americana. Unfortunately for Hunt, Emelianenko was able to fight through it and submit Hunt with a kimura.

Post-PRIDE
On 21 July 2008, more than a year after his previous MMA fight, Hunt returned to MMA to face Alistair Overeem at the Dream 5: Lightweight Grand Prix 2008 Final Round, and was submitted by an armlock in just over a minute into the first round.

Hunt was set to fight Jerome Le Banner at Dynamite!! 2008 but ended up fighting late replacement Melvin Manhoef after Le Banner pulled out. Despite the fact that he had a substantial weight advantage over Manhoef, he was knocked out in 18 seconds in the first round. This marked the first time he had been stopped by knockout due to punches to the head.

On 26 May 2009, Hunt fought former DREAM Middleweight Champion Gegard Mousasi in the opening round of the Super Hulk Grand Prix at Dream 9. He lost the fight via submission in the first round.

Ultimate Fighting Championship
Hunt was transferred to the UFC as part of their acquisition of Pride Fighting Championships. The UFC offered to pay up Hunt's contract and more – totaling $450,000 – but Hunt elected to fight instead.
 
Hunt made his UFC debut on 25 September 2010, at UFC 119 against fellow UFC newcomer and undefeated prospect Sean McCorkle. Hunt trained with American Top Team for the fight. Photos that had emerged on the internet had shown that Hunt had lost a considerable amount of weight in comparison to that of his Pride days. Hunt lost the fight via submission in the first round.

Hunt's next fight in the UFC was against Chris Tuchscherer at UFC 127 on 27 February 2011, in Sydney, Australia. Hunt defeated Tuchscherer in the second round via KO, earning Knockout of the Night honors.

Hunt faced Ben Rothwell at UFC 135 on 24 September 2011. He won the fight via unanimous decision.

Hunt next faced Cheick Kongo on 26 February 2012, at UFC 144. He won the fight via TKO in the first round.

Hunt was expected face Stefan Struve on 26 May 2012, at UFC 146. However, he pulled out of the bout due to injury ten days prior to the event.

The bout with Struve was rescheduled for 3 March 2013, at UFC on Fuel TV 8. Hunt defeated Struve via third-round TKO in a performance that earned him Knockout of the Night honors.

Hunt faced Junior dos Santos on 25 May 2013, at UFC 160, replacing an injured Alistair Overeem. Hunt lost the fight via knockout in the third round in a bout that earned both participants Fight of the Night honors. Afterwards, some major MMA media outlets were considering this to be the best fight in the history of the UFC heavyweight division.

Hunt faced Antônio Silva in the main event on 7 December 2013, at UFC Fight Night 33. The fight went to a decision, with one judge scoring it 48–47 for Hunt, while the other two judges had the scores even 47–47, resulting in a majority draw. Post-fight, Dana White stated that the bout won Fight of the Night and, despite the draw result, both men would receive their win bonuses. The bout with Silva has been described as one of the best in the promotion's heavyweight history. In a post-fight test, Silva tested positive for elevated testosterone, which was believed to be attributed to undergoing UFC-approved testosterone replacement therapy.  In turn, the bout is still a "draw" on Hunt's official record, while in Silva's case it was overturned to a no-contest.

Contract dispute
On 5 August 2014, Hunt posted cryptic tweets about becoming unemployed, which Dana White immediately denied. At first, Hunt blamed his tweets on hunger, but later in mid-August he revealed that he had decided to walk away from the sport due to business reasons. Hunt originally wanted a three-fight contract while the UFC wanted an eight-fight contract. After Hunt's decision to walk away, his wife convinced him to return to fighting and he ended up with a six-fight contract with the organization. At the end of August 2014, Hunt revealed that the contract would be the last of his mixed martial arts career.

Continuation in UFC
Hunt faced Roy Nelson on 20 September 2014, at UFC Fight Night 52. He won the fight via knockout in the second round. The win earned Hunt his first Performance of the Night bonus award, and the World MMA Awards' 2014 Knockout of the Year award.

On 21 October 2014, it was announced that Hunt would replace injured UFC Heavyweight Champion Cain Velasquez in the main event of UFC 180. He faced off against Fabrício Werdum for the interim UFC Heavyweight Championship. Despite having early success and dropping Werdum twice, Hunt lost the fight via TKO in the second round.

Hunt faced Stipe Miocic on 10 May 2015, at UFC Fight Night 65. He lost the fight via TKO in the fifth round. Miocic set a UFC record for the most strikes landed in a fight, outlanding Hunt 361 – 48 over the duration of the bout.

Hunt faced Antônio Silva in a rematch on 15 November 2015, at UFC 193. Hunt won the fight via TKO, after dropping Silva with a straight right up against the fence at 3:41 of the first round.

Hunt faced Frank Mir on 20 March 2016, at UFC Fight Night 85. He won the fight via KO in the first round after sending Mir to the canvas with a right hand. He was awarded with Performance of the Night for his efforts. It was later announced that Mir failed an in-competition drug test.

Despite talks about Hunt's current contract being his last, on 14 April 2016, it was announced that Hunt had signed a new six-fight, multi-million dollar contract with the UFC.

Hunt faced a returning Brock Lesnar on 9 July 2016, at UFC 200. He lost the fight via unanimous decision. However, on 15 July, it was revealed that Lesnar had tested positive for a banned substance in a pre-fight drug test. The test result was conducted on 28, 11 June days prior to the fight, and was flagged by USADA as a potential anti-doping violation. On 19 July, the UFC announced that Lesnar tested positive for the same banned substance in a second, in-competition sample. On 23 August, the Nevada Athletic Commission confirmed that Lesnar twice tested positive for the estrogen blocker clomiphene, and that he has been temporarily suspended. Due to Lesnar's positive tests, the result of the fight was changed to a no contest.

Hunt faced Alistair Overeem in a rematch on 4 March 2017, at UFC 209. He lost the fight via knockout in the third round.

Hunt faced Derrick Lewis on 11 June 2017, in the main event at UFC Fight Night 110. It was the first combat sports event in Auckland since UFC Fight Night 43 in Vector Arena. He won the fight via TKO in round four. The win also earned Hunt his third Fight of the Night bonus award.

Hunt was expected to face Marcin Tybura on 19 November 2017, at UFC Fight Night: Hunt vs. Tybura. However, on 10 October, Hunt was pulled from the card and was replaced by Fabrício Werdum after UFC officials reviewed Hunt's article, entitled, "If I Die Fighting, That's Fine" on his health status from the consequences he suffered from his long term fighting career (slur speech and loss of memory- an early signs of chronic traumatic encephalopathy (CTE)). Hunt was upset with the news, responding on his Instagram that the quote was taken out of context and that he had been cleared to fight by doctors two days before he was pulled from the bout.

On 5 December 2017, it was announced that Hunt had been cleared to fight after undergoing medical tests in Las Vegas that were arranged by the UFC.

Hunt faced Curtis Blaydes on 11 February 2018, at UFC 221. Prior to the event, Hunt announced that he would not seek to renew his contract after it expired. Hunt knocked down Blaydes in the first round, but would be outwrestled for the remainder of the fight and lost via unanimous decision.

Hunt faced Aleksei Oleinik on 15 September 2018, in the main event of UFC Fight Night 136. He lost the fight via rear-naked choke submission in the first round.

Hunt faced Justin Willis on 2 December 2018, at UFC Fight Night 142. He lost the fight via unanimous decision. The fight was his last fight of his UFC contract, with Hunt stating that he would continue his fighting career with other organizations.

Boxing
Hunt faced Paul Gallen in a six-round heavyweight match on 16 December 2020 at Bankwest Stadium in Sydney, Australia. He lost via unanimous decision.

Hunt faced Sonny Bill Williams on 5 November 2022 at Ken Rosewall Arena in Sydney, Australia. He won the fight via technical knockout in the fourth round.

Professional wrestling career

Hustle (2007–2008)
Hunt had his first professional wrestling appearance on 25 November 2007 for Japanese promotion Hustle. He was introduced as a living weapon sorted in a Dynamite Hardcore Weapons Match between a team of the babyface faction Hustle Army (formed by Kintaman and Kurodaman) and one of the heel stable Takada Monster Army (Monster C and "Fire Monster" Achichi). After Kintaman gained control of him, Hunt knocked out both C and Achichi and allowed the Hustle Army to win the match. Hunt stayed in the ring and danced with the victorious Kintaman and Kurodaman, though accidentally knocking them out as well in the process.

Hunt returned to the promotion on 21 February 2008, coming to the ring to save Monster Bono from a beating by Tiger Jeet Singh and his allies of the Takada Monster Army. Hunt and Bono teamed up at the next event on 24 February, marking Hunt's first and last professional wrestling match. They wrestled Singh and Commander An Jo and won the bout when Bono pinned the latter.

Fighting style
Hunt is known as a brawler and prefers to fight standing up. He has a powerful left hook and right straight. The majority of Hunt's MMA career wins have come via KO or TKO from punches; he has no submission wins. Hunt also holds a notable KO victory over Roy Nelson, who is cited as having one of the most durable chins in combat sports.

Hunt is known for having a strong chin. This was shown in his bout against Mirko Cro Cop in K-1 World Grand Prix 2002 in Nagoya, in which he went the distance with the Croatian in spite of being hit by one of Cro Cop's famous headkicks in the third round. Hunt fought Cro Cop a second time in Pride Shockwave 2005 and won by decision.

Television and film
Hunt is the subject of a feature-length documentary The Art of Fighting (2013), which premiered on Fuel TV (Australia) on 22 May 2013.

Hunt was cast in a small role in the Australian film Crazy Murder, released in 2014.

Personal life
Hunt was born a Mormon, but is now a born-again Christian. He lives in Australia with his second wife and has six children. The first two children from his first marriage are already adults. Hunt and his second wife, Julie, met in a reggae club around 1994 and have four children. In December 2014 Hunt's older brother John committed suicide at the age of 44.

In August 2015, Hunt became a vegan after viewing undercover video footage of the insides of a factory farm. On his Facebook page, where he posted the video, he captioned, "I'm going vegan, hate this". However, on 7 July 2016, Hunt stated that he has not gone completely vegan due to the time demands of the sport, but is a vegetarian.

Auckland's UFC team and Game of Thrones star Jason Momoa (Khal Drogo) performed "Haka – a traditional war cry, dance or challenge from the Maori people from New Zealand" to cheer and support Hunt on his upcoming fight against Derrick Lewis.

Championships and accomplishments

Kickboxing
K-1
2002 K-1 World Grand Prix Final 3rd Place
2001 K-1 World Grand Prix Champion
2001 K-1 World Grand Prix in Fukuoka Repechage B Champion
2001 K-1 World Grand Prix Preliminary Melbourne Champion
2000 K-1 Oceania Grand Prix Champion
World Kickboxing Federation
1999 WKBF Australian Super Heavyweight Champion

Mixed martial arts
Ultimate Fighting Championship
Knockout of the Night (Two times) 
Fight of the Night (Three times) 
Performance of the Night (Two times) 
Sherdog
2014 All-Violence Third Team
Fight Matrix
2004 Rookie of the Year
2004 Most Noteworthy Upset of the Year vs. Wanderlei Silva on 31 December
2004 Most Lopsided Upset of the Year vs. Wanderlei Silva on 31 December
World MMA Awards
2014 Knockout of the Year vs. Roy Nelson at UFC Fight Night: Hunt vs. Nelson
MMAJunkie.com
2014 September Knockout of the Month vs. Roy Nelson

Mixed martial arts record

|-
|Loss
|align=center| (1)
|Justin Willis
|Decision (unanimous)
|UFC Fight Night: dos Santos vs. Tuivasa
|
|align=center|3
|align=center|5:00
|Adelaide, Australia
|
|-
|Loss
|align=center|13–13–1 (1)
|Aleksei Oleinik
|Submission (rear-naked choke)
|UFC Fight Night: Hunt vs. Oleinik
|
|align=center|1
|align=center|4:26
|Moscow, Russia
|
|-
|Loss
|align=center|13–12–1 (1)
|Curtis Blaydes
|Decision (unanimous)
|UFC 221
|
|align=center|3
|align=center|5:00
|Perth, Australia
|
|-
|Win
|align=center|13–11–1 (1)
|Derrick Lewis
|TKO (punches)
|UFC Fight Night: Lewis vs. Hunt
|
|align=center|4
|align=center|3:51
|Auckland, New Zealand
|
|-
|Loss
|align=center|12–11–1 (1)
|Alistair Overeem
|KO (knee)
|UFC 209
|
|align=center|3
|align=center|1:44
|Las Vegas, Nevada, United States
|
|-
|NC
|align=center|12–10–1 (1)
|Brock Lesnar
|NC (overturned)
|UFC 200
|
|align=center|3
|align=center|5:00
|Las Vegas, Nevada, United States
|
|-
|Win
|align=center|12–10–1
|Frank Mir
|KO (punch)
|UFC Fight Night: Hunt vs. Mir
|
|align=center|1
|align=center|3:01
|Brisbane, Australia
|
|-
|Win
|align=center|11–10–1
|Antônio Silva
|TKO (punches)
|UFC 193
|
|align=center|1
|align=center|3:41
|Melbourne, Australia
|
|-
|Loss
|align=center|10–10–1
|Stipe Miocic
|TKO (punches)
|UFC Fight Night: Miocic vs. Hunt
|
|align=center|5
|align=center|2:47
|Adelaide, Australia
|
|-
|Loss
|align=center|10–9–1
|Fabrício Werdum
|TKO (knee and punches)
|UFC 180
|
|align=center|2
|align=center|2:27
|Mexico City, Mexico
|
|-
| Win
| align=center| 10–8–1
| Roy Nelson
| KO (punch)
| UFC Fight Night: Hunt vs. Nelson
| 
| align=center| 2
| align=center| 3:00
| Saitama, Japan
| 
|-
| Draw
| align=center| 9–8–1
| Antônio Silva
| Draw (majority)
| UFC Fight Night: Hunt vs. Bigfoot
| 
| align=center| 5
| align=center| 5:00
| Brisbane, Australia
| 
|-
| Loss
| align=center| 9–8
| Junior dos Santos
| KO (spinning hook kick)
| UFC 160
| 
| align=center| 3
| align=center| 4:18
| Las Vegas, Nevada, United States
| 
|-
| Win
| align=center| 9–7
| Stefan Struve
| TKO (punches)
| UFC on Fuel TV: Silva vs. Stann
| 
| align=center| 3
| align=center| 1:44
| Saitama, Japan
| 
|-
| Win
| align=center| 8–7
| Cheick Kongo
| TKO (punches)
| UFC 144
| 
| align=center| 1
| align=center| 2:11
| Saitama, Japan
| 
|-
| Win
| align=center| 7–7
| Ben Rothwell
| Decision (unanimous)
| UFC 135
| 
| align=center| 3
| align=center| 5:00
| Denver, Colorado, United States
| 
|-
| Win
| align=center| 6–7
| Chris Tuchscherer
| KO (punch)
| UFC 127
| 
| align=center| 2
| align=center| 1:41
| Sydney, Australia
| 
|-
| Loss
| align=center| 5–7
| Sean McCorkle
| Submission (straight armbar)
| UFC 119
| 
| align=center| 1
| align=center| 1:03
| Indianapolis, Indiana, United States
| 
|-
| Loss
| align=center| 5–6
| Gegard Mousasi
| Submission (straight armbar)
| Dream 9
| 
| align=center| 1
| align=center| 1:20
| Yokohama, Japan
| 
|-
| Loss
| align=center| 5–5
| Melvin Manhoef
| KO (punches)
| Dynamite!! 2008
| 
| align=center| 1
| align=center| 0:18
| Saitama, Japan
| 
|-
| Loss
| align=center| 5–4
| Alistair Overeem
| Submission (keylock)
| Dream 5: Lightweight Grand Prix 2008 Final Round
| 
| align=center| 1
| align=center| 1:11
| Osaka, Japan
| 
|-
| Loss
| align=center| 5–3
| Fedor Emelianenko
| Submission (kimura)
| Pride Shockwave 2006
| 
| align=center| 1
| align=center| 8:16
| Saitama, Japan
| 
|-
| Loss
| align=center| 5–2
| Josh Barnett
| Submission (kimura)
| Pride Critical Countdown Absolute
| 
| align=center| 1
| align=center| 2:02
| Saitama, Japan
| 
|-
| Win
| align=center| 5–1
| Tsuyoshi Kohsaka
| TKO (punches)
| Pride Total Elimination Absolute
| 
| align=center| 2
| align=center| 4:15
| Osaka, Japan
| 
|-
| Win
| align=center| 4–1
| Yosuke Nishijima
| KO (punch)
| Pride 31
| 
| align=center| 3
| align=center| 1:18
| Saitama, Japan
| 
|-
| Win
| align=center| 3–1
| Mirko Cro Cop
| Decision (split)
| PRIDE Shockwave 2005
| 
| align=center| 3
| align=center| 5:00
| Saitama, Japan
| 
|-
| Win
| align=center| 2–1
| Wanderlei Silva
| Decision (split)
| PRIDE Shockwave 2004
| 
| align=center| 3
| align=center| 5:00
| Saitama, Japan
| 
|-
| Win
| align=center| 1–1
| Dan Bobish
| TKO (kick to the body)
| PRIDE 28
| 
| align=center| 1
| align=center| 6:23
| Saitama, Japan
| 
|-
| Loss
| align=center| 0–1
| Hidehiko Yoshida
| Submission (armbar)
| PRIDE Critical Countdown 2004
| 
| align=center| 1
| align=center| 5:25
| Saitama, Japan
|

Kickboxing record (incomplete)

Professional boxing record

| style="text-align:center;" colspan="8"|1 Wins (1 knockout, 0 decisions),  2 Losses (0 knockouts, 2 decisions), 1 Draw
|-  style="text-align:center; background:#e3e3e3;"
|  style="border-style:none none solid solid; "|Res.
|  style="border-style:none none solid solid; "|Record
|  style="border-style:none none solid solid; "|Opponent
|  style="border-style:none none solid solid; "|Type
|  style="border-style:none none solid solid; "|Rd., Time
|  style="border-style:none none solid solid; "|Date
|  style="border-style:none none solid solid; "|Location
|  style="border-style:none none solid solid; "|Notes
|- align=center
|Win
|align=center|1–2–1||align=left| Sonny Bill Williams
|
|4 (8)
|2022-11-05
|align=left| Ken Rosewall Arena, Sydney, Australia
|align=left|
|- align=center
|Loss
|align=center|0–2–1||align=left| Paul Gallen
|PTS
|6
|2020-12-16
|align=left| Bankwest Stadium, Parramatta, Australia
|align=left|
|- align=center
|style="background: #c5d2ea"|Draw
|align=center|0–1–1||align=left| Joe Askew
|
|4
|2000-04-23
|align=left| Wyong RSL Club, Wyong, New South Wales, Australia
|align=left|
|- align=center
|Loss
|align=center|0–1||align=left| John Wyborn
|
|3
|1998-08-21
|align=left| Bondi Diggers Club, Sydney, Australia
|align=left|
|- align=center

See also
 List of male kickboxers
 List of current UFC fighters
 List of male mixed martial artists
 List of K-1 events
 List of PRIDE events
 List of K-1 champions

References

External links

 
 
 
 

1974 births
Living people
New Zealand Christians
New Zealand male kickboxers
New Zealand male boxers
New Zealand practitioners of Brazilian jiu-jitsu
Samoan practitioners of Brazilian jiu-jitsu
Heavyweight kickboxers
Heavyweight boxers
New Zealand male mixed martial artists
Samoan male mixed martial artists
Heavyweight mixed martial artists
Super heavyweight mixed martial artists
Mixed martial artists utilizing boxing
Mixed martial artists utilizing kickboxing
Mixed martial artists utilizing wrestling
Mixed martial artists utilizing Brazilian jiu-jitsu
Sportspeople from Auckland
New Zealand sportspeople of Samoan descent
New Zealand expatriates in Australia
Former Latter Day Saints
Fighters trained by Lolo Heimuli
Ultimate Fighting Championship male fighters
New Zealand male professional wrestlers